The NJCAA women's basketball championship is an American intercollegiate basketball tournament conducted by the National Junior College Athletic Association (NJCAA), and determines the women's national champion. The tournament has been held since 1975. There are three divisions, I, II and III. The most successful program, Trinity Valley Community College, has won Division I eight times, including three straight championships from 2012-2015. From 1998-2014, the tournament was hosted at Bicentennial Center in Salina, Kansas. The 2016-2018 tournaments will be held at Rip Griffin Center, on the campus of former NJCAA member Lubbock Christian University, in Lubbock, Texas.

Division I

Division  II

Division III

See also
NJCAA Men's Division I Basketball Championship
NJCAA Men's Division II Basketball Championship
NJCAA Men's Division III Basketball Championship

References